The 2008 Categoría Primera B season, officially known as the 2008 Copa Premier season for sponsorship reasons) was the 19th season since its founding as Colombia's second division football league.

Teams 

 Team in italics replaced Bajo Cauca for the Torneo Finalización.

Torneo Apertura

First stage

Group A

Group B

Semifinals

Group A

Group B

Finals

Deportivo Rionegro won 4–0 on aggregate.

Torneo Finalización

First stage

Group A

Group B

Semifinals

Group A

Group B

Finals

Real Cartagena won 3–2 on aggregate.

Championship final

Real Cartagena won 4–2 on aggregate.

Promotion/relegation playoff
As the second worst team in the 2008 Categoría Primera A relegation table, Envigado had to play a two-legged tie against Deportivo Rionegro, the Primera B runner-up. As the Primera A team, Envigado played the second leg at home. The winner competed in the Primera A for the 2009 season, while the loser competed in the Primera B.

External links
Copa Mustang Official Page
Dimayor Official Page
Colombia 2008 - RSSSF

Categoría Primera B seasons
2008 in Colombian football
Colombia

es:Categoría Primera B
pl:Categoría Primera B